HD 109749 b is an extrasolar planet that orbits extremely close to the star HD 109749, taking only 5.24 days to orbit at the distance of 0.063 AU. This planet was discovered on August 22, 2005 - the same day as the discovery of Gliese 581 b.

See also
 HD 149143 b

References

External links
 

Hot Jupiters
Exoplanets discovered in 2005
Giant planets
Centaurus (constellation)
Exoplanets detected by radial velocity